Nay Toe (born Nay Lin Aung on 9 September 1981) is a Arakanese film actor and comedian with the Burmese traditional dance troupe Htawara Hninzi. He won Myanmar Motion Picture Academy Awards for Best Actor three times: in 2009 with Moe Nya Einmet Myu, in 2015 with Nat Khat Mhar Tae Tite Pwal, and in 2017 with Tar Tay Gyi. He also won the Star Award for the film Bridge of Clouds in 2018. He is one of the highest-paid actors in Myanmar.

Early life 
Nay Toe was born on 9 September 1981 in Tawhtu village in Manaung Township, Cheduba Island, to ethnic Arakanese parents, Than Myaing and her husband Aung Than. He is the second child of four siblings. His younger brother Min Thway is also an actor. He began his career as a model and eventually transitioned to cinema. He graduated from Yangon University with a BSc in Mathematics.

Career 
Nay Toe moved to Yangon in 1999, where he joined the YIIK modeling agency and took singing lessons. He gained some titles in modeling contests. He modeled under the name Zin Min.

He released an album in 2000, but without any success.

He starred in music videos and began exploring acting. In 2001, he starred in his first movie, 3 Weeks. 
Since 2007, Nay Toe has been acting with the Htawara Hninzi (Eternal Rose) Burmese cultural dance show, in which he is one of the supporting comedians, along with Tun Tun, Moe Moe, Ye Lay and Kyaw Kyaw Bo. The director of the show is Maung Myo Min.

In 2011, he won an Academy award for Best Leading Actor for his role in Moe Nya Einmet Myu. His role in the movie was said to be intricate, as the character he portrayed was suffering from multiple personality disorder and displayed three different personalities throughout the story.

Other projects

Television commercials 
Nay Toe has appeared in several television commercials, including those for Myanmar Airways International, soft drinks, jewelry stores, fashion, and sports apparel.

Propaganda films 
Nay Toe has appeared in a pro-regime propaganda film, Lotus at Dawn.

He has been criticized for starring in the film, especially by Burmese pro-democracy groups in exile. However, an anonymous source from the Burma film industry reported that the actors had been compelled to play their respective roles in the movie by the SPDC, threatening the cast that they might be censored for at least one year if they refused to take part in the film.

Many leading Burmese actors and actresses took part in the film, including Lu Min, Pyay Ti Oo, Eindra Kyaw Zin, and Wyne Su Khine Thein.

Nay Toe acted in another propaganda film on the history of the Burmese Army called Kye Sin Mawgun (Epic of the Stars). The film started with the Thirty Comrades during the independence struggle and ended with the current military regime.

Publications 
Nay Toe released his autobiography and fashion book, Un Tightened Doors, on 1 January 2011. The 21 chapters of the book review both his career and his personal life, including a large photo gallery. The book focuses on his religious insight into Buddhism as a devoted Buddhist.

Entertainment tours 
Nay Toe traveled to Japan, Singapore and Malaysia in 2011 on entertainment tours. He has also been invited to Australia, Singapore, London, Malaysia, Japan and New Zealand.

Humanitarian work

Nay Toe's humanitarian work includes raising funds for those affected by the cyclones Nargis and Giri. He has also participated in various charity shows held in Burma and overseas. He donated to several retirement homes and orphanages as a celebration of winning the Academy Award in January 2011 in place of holding a lavish party. For his 30th birthday, he sponsored a place of worship in the center of his hometown.

Personal life

Personality 
Nay Toe is introverted, reserved and reticent in nature; people often mistake him for being arrogant. This aura of coldness is how he got his nickname, "Ice Prince".

Relationships 
He married Thel Su Myat Shwe on February 5, 2022 at their house in Yangon.

Hobbies and interests 
Nay Toe has revealed his artistic ability and has held an interest in crafts since he was young, especially in paintings and sculptures. His favorite painting techniques are watercolor and acrylic. He has won prizes for his drawings and sculptures since primary school. Other hobbies include reading, photography, music and travelling. His favorite sport is swimming, and he also plays tennis and golf occasionally.

Religion 
Nay Toe is known for being a pious Theravada Buddhist.

The religious section of his biography includes four chapters where he expresses his religious beliefs, Buddhist teachings that inspired him, and his experience and thoughts on Vipassanā meditation.

Nay Toe described Buddha as the most respectable and inspirational person in his life in the chapter "Character in My Religious Sight".

In another chapter, "The Most Important Movie of Life From Vipassanā Point of View", he mentioned Vipassanā as a director of life that can guide people to achieve their inner peace and liberation, eventually attaining enlightenment through Vipassanā.

In the chapter "Standard of Life", he emphasizes his belief that one's standard of life is determined by having knowledge of and practicing Vipassanā meditation rather than materialistic possession.

In the "Vipassanā and Me" chapter, Nay Toe elaborates on why and how he practices Vipassanā meditation.

Filmography

Major films

Direct-to-video 
Nay Toe has starred in over one hundred direct-to-video films since 2001. The following is a list of these works.

Awards and nominations

References

External links 
  

Living people

1981 births
21st-century Burmese male singers
Burmese comedians
Burmese male film actors
Burmese male models
Burmese people of Rakhine descent
Burmese Theravada Buddhists
Burmese writers
People from Rakhine State
University of Yangon alumni